The  is a rapid transit electric multiple unit (EMU) train type operated by the Transportation Bureau City of Nagoya on the Nagoya Subway Tsurumai Line in Japan since March 2012.

Formation
, the fleet consists of four six-car sets, N3101 to N3104, formed as follows, with three motored ("M") cars and three non-powered trailer ("T") cars. (Weights are for the aluminium-bodied first set, N3101.)

The M1, M2, and M3 cars are each equipped with a single-arm pantograph.

Interior
The trains feature longitudinal bench seating throughout with blue moquette seat covers, and red moquette for priority seating at the ends of cars. The moquette incorporates a pattern based on Arimatsu tie-dyeing designs for which Nagoya is famous. 17-inch wide-aspect LCD passenger information displays are provided above alternate doorways, with four per car.

History
The first set, N3101, was delivered from Hitachi's factory in Kudamatsu, Yamaguchi in October 2011. It entered revenue service from 16 March 2012. The second set, N3102, was built at Nippon Sharyo's factory in Toyokawa, Aichi, and delivered in May 2012.

Build details
The build histories of individual sets are as follows. Set N3101 has an aluminium body, while sets N3102 onward have stainless steel bodies.

References

External links

 Transportation Bureau City of Nagoya N3000 series train information 

Electric multiple units of Japan
N3000 series
Hitachi multiple units
Train-related introductions in 2012
Nippon Sharyo multiple units
1500 V DC multiple units of Japan